John T. Hill (born 1934) is an American artist. His work focuses mainly on design and photography.

Education

As an undergraduate at the University of Georgia, Hill studied painting, design, and photography, earning a BFA in design in 1955, and an MFA in painting in 1956. After a tour of infantry duty he continued graduate studies in design and photography at the Yale School of Art and Architecture.

Teaching

On graduating, he was invited to join the Yale faculty, where he taught both graphic design and photography. His faculty colleagues from the 1960s and 70s included Alvin Eisenman, Walker Evans, Herbert Matter, Norman Ives, Bradbury Thompson, and Paul Rand.

When Yale's Graphic Design Department was established in 1951 photography was seen as an integral part of the curriculum . Twenty years later, with photography's increased presence in the arts, Eisenman and Hill founded Yale's first Department of Photography, making it independent from its parent, Graphic Design.

Hill served as the department's first Director of Graduate Studies in Photography from 1971 to 1978.

Professional work

In more than twenty years of teaching, Hill continued to work as a photographer, taking pictures for numerous books, magazines, and corporate publications. As a designer, his work is diverse, ranging from US postage stamp design to exhibition installations. Within the last ten years he has focused primarily on books and exhibition designs, as well as writing.

Executor of Walker Evans' estate
Three years before his death, Walker Evans asked Hill to serve as executor of his estate. On Evans' death in 1975, Hill took as a goal the expanded reading of Evans' work. The most common perception was, at best, a bathetic record of the Great Depression in the rural South. For Hill and many others, Evans' work rose high above that limited appraisal to be examined as a more universal statement surpassing the specifics of that time and place. As executor, Hill produced four books for the Evans estate. Others followed, all with that same purpose.

During and after his 19-year tenure as Evans' executor, Hill created many exhibitions of gelatin silver prints made from Evans' negatives. Within the last ten years, Hill has used the digital techniques of scanning, file adjustment, and digital printing to interpret Evans' images. These digital tools allow maintaining detailed information in both dark and light passages, in a manner not possible with gelatin silver printing. Hill has used these digital files to produce prints, exhibitions, and books that extend the appreciation of Evans' intricate and multi-layered work. These exhibitions have been shown in museums and galleries in France, Germany, Italy, Switzerland, Korea, New York City, and numerous other American institutions.

With Hill's help, the Evans archive was acquired by the Metropolitan Museum of Art in 1994. There it has received appreciation for its intrinsic value as the work of one of America's seminal artists. Proper conservation and cataloging can only be realized by an institution with such perception, size, and depth. The major portion of that archive is now available for study online.

Writings and Publications

Hill has also produced books presenting the work of wide-ranging talents, including Walker Evans, W. Eugene Smith, Edward Weston, Erwin Hauer, and Peter Sekaer.

In 2013 Hill designed the book Calder by Matter for Cahiers d'Art. It is Herbert Matter's intimate account of Calder's work and his family life for over thirty years.

Books related to Walker Evans produced by J. Hill:

 Walker Evans First and Last
 Walker Evans at Work
 Walker Evans Havana
 Walker The Hungry Eye
 Walker Evans Lyric Documentary
 Walker Evans: Depth of Field

Books designed, edited, authored, co-authored, or produced by Hill
The Eye of Walker Evans. Luc Sante. On the occasion of the exhibition Walker Evans: New York (Los Angeles, J. Paul Getty Museum, 28 July-11 Oct 1998). Broadly surveys the life and work of Evans.
Walker Evans: First and Last. Harper and Row, New York, 1978. Seker Warburg, London, 1978. Design, picture sequence, production, Hill.
Walker Evans at Work. Harper and Row, New York, 1982. Thames and Hudson, London, 1982. Essay, Jerry L. Thompson. Concept, design, and picture editing, Hill
Walker Evans Havana 1933. Contrejour, Paris, 1989. Pantheon, New York, 1989. Concept, design and picture editing, Hill with Carla Miller.
Walker Evans: The Hungry Eye. Co-authors, Hill, Gilles Mora. Les Editions du Seuil, Paris, 1993 Harry N. Abrams. New York, 1993. Winner of the Prix de Nadar, Paris. The Krasna Krausz Book Award, London. Design Judy Kohn, concept and supervision Hill.
W. Eugene Smith Photographs 1934-1975. Co-authors, Hill, Gilles Mora. Seuil, Paris, 1988. Harry N. Abrams. New York, 1988. Thames and Hudson, London, 1988. Design and picture editing, Hill and Dorothy Hill.
Walker Evans Simple Secrets. High Museum of Art. Harry N. Abrams. New York, 1998. Design, picture editing, and production, Hill. Honored by the AIGA as one of 50 Books of the Year.
Walker Evans: Depth of Field. Co-authors, Hill and Heinz Liesbrock. Design, Hill. Prestel, Munich, 2015.
Edward Weston: Forms of Passion, Passion of Forms. Seuil, Paris, 1998. Harry N. Abrams. New York, 1998. Thames and Hudson, London, 1998. Design and picture editing, Hill and Dorothy Hill.
Walker Evans. Biography by James Mellow. HillBasic, New York, 1999. Design, picture editing, Hill and Dorothy Hill. Honored by the AIGA as one of 50 Books of the Year.
The Idea of Cuba: Alex Harris. University of New Mexico Press. In association with The Center of Documentary Studies. Duke University, 2003. Design, Hill.
Herbert Matter Stanford University, 2005. On the occasion of the acquisition of the Matter Archive. Design, picture editing, separations, and production, Hill.
Erwin Hauer: Continua. Architectural Screens and Walls. Princeton Architectural. New York, 2004. Design and picture editing, Hill.
Walker Evans: Lyric Documentary. Author and picture editor, Hill. Steidl, Göttingen, Germany, 2007. Book design, and digital separations, Hill.
Walker Evans American Photographs. Books on Books. Errata, New York, 2008. Primary essay, "The Legacy of Seeing," Hill.
Peter Sekaer: Signs of Life. Author and picture editor, Hill. Steidl, Göttingen, Germany, 2010. Book design, and digital separations, Hill.
Calder by Matter. Essays by Jed Perl and Hill. Cahiers d'Art, Paris, 2013. Book design, separations, and printing supervision, Hill.
May Day at Yale, Recollections 1970 Co-authors, Henry Chauncey, Thomas Strong, and Hill. 2015.
Walker Evans: Labor Anonymous. Edited by Thomas Zander. Walther König, Cologne. Essays by David Campany, Heinz Liesbrock and Jerry L. Thompson.

Exhibitions Produced By Hill
The Work of Hebert Matter and Alvin Lustig, Hill created an exhibition featuring their work in the University of Georgia's art school gallery, 1954
Lincoln's America, USIA Exhibition. Hill was part of a small team of students and faculty who created the exhibition over a Christmas Holiday in 1958 and early 59. Faculty advisors were Alvin Eisenman, Norman Ives, and Bradbury Thompson, 1958
Photographs by Hebert Matter, with work by Herbert Matter, Foto Festival, Arles, France, 2000
Photographs by Peter Sekaer, with work by Peter Sekaer, Foto Festival, Arles, France, 2002
Walker Evans: Carbon and Silver, produced by Hill and Sven Martson, Evans' centennial exhibition, Yale University Art School Gallery, 2003; Harvard University, 2003; Duke University, 2003; Museo di Roma, Palazzo Brachi, 2005–06; UBS Gallery and Yale School of Art Avenue of Americas, 2006; Museo Alinari, Piazza S.M. Novella, Firenze, Italy, 2007.
Norman Ives: Constructions & Reconstructions, American Institute of Graphic Arts, New York City, 2007
Walker Evans: Carbon and Silver, Fenimore Art Museum, Cooperstown, New York, 2009
The Exacting Eye of Walker Evans, Florence Griswold Museum, 2011/12
Walker Evans's "Havana 1933", Laguardia Community College, 2013
The Art of Walker Evans, Sandra Naddaff and Leigh Hafrey Three Columns Gallery, 2014
Walker Evans: Depth of Field, Josef Albers Museum, Bottrop, Germany, 2015/16. Most comprehensive exhibition to date, over 270 items.
Walker Evans: Depth of Field, Vancouver Art Gallery, 2016
Norman Ives: Constructions & Reconstructions, Rochester Institute of Technology, 2016/17Norman Ives: Constructions & Reconstructions, UMASS North Dartmouth, 2021

Exhibitions of work by HillFour Directions in Modern Photography, Yale University Art Gallery, 1973Bulldog and Panther Exhibition, Yale University Art Gallery, 2014John T. Hill: Persistent Observer'', The Institute Library (New Haven), 2021/22

Museum collections
International Center for Photography: 4 prints)
Yale Art Gallery: 1 print)
Bibliotheque Nationale
MoMA, Study Collection
Black Mountain College
Josef and Annie Albers Foundation Collection
Josef Alberts Museum, Bottrop, Germany

References

1934 births
Living people
American male artists
American male writers
American photographers
University of Georgia alumni
People from Jackson County, Georgia
Yale School of Art alumni
Yale School of Art faculty